L101 may refer to:
 Albatros L.101, a 1930s German trainer aircraft
 L101 railway (Croatia), a railway line in Croatia between Čakovec and Mursko Središće
 Landsverk L-101, an ultra-light weight tank destroyer armed with a 20mm cannon
 Letov L-101, an airliner designed in Czechoslovakia shortly after the end of the Second World War
 ICAO code for the Lockheed L-1011 TriStar airliner
 Sonde language (L101), Bantu language of the Democratic Republic of the Congo